Sigma Virginis (σ Vir, σ Virginis) is a star in the zodiac constellation of Virgo. It can be faintly seen with the naked eye with a baseline apparent visual magnitude of 4.86. Based upon parallax measurements, the distance to this star is roughly 680 light-years.

This is an evolved red giant star with a stellar classification of M1 III. It is a suspected variable star with a brightness that ranges from magnitude +4.77 to +4.86. This variation has pulsation periods of 23.4, 24.3, 27.9 and 34.1 days. The effective temperature of the stellar atmosphere is around 3,800 K, and it shines with 1,734 times the luminosity of the Sun.

References

Virginis, Sigma
Virgo (constellation)
M-type giants
Suspected variables
Virginis, 060
115521
064852
5015
Durchmusterung objects